The 2012 American Ultimate Disc League season was the first season for the league. Each team was scheduled to play a 16-game schedule. The Philadelphia Spinners won the championship over the Indianapolis AlleyCats at the Pontiac Silverdome. After the season all but three teams (Detroit Mechanix, Indianapolis AlleyCats, and the Bluegrass Revolution) left or folded.

Lawsuit

The first season of the AUDL was marred by controversy as the league sued two of its franchises, the Connecticut Constitution and the Rhode Island Rampage. The Connecticut Constitution were not allowed to play in the playoffs due to being fined $20,000 by the AUDL and refusing to pay. As a result, the Rhode Island Rampage become the second seed in the Eastern Division playoff game.

Standings

Eastern Division

The Constitution were disqualified from the postseason due to unpaid fines.

Western Division

Playoffs

References

American Ultimate Disc League
2012 in American sports